Kalpana Patowary is an Indian playback and folk singer from Assam. She sings in 30 languages and has many folk and popular songs to her credit, while Bhojpuri music has been her most dedicated foray. In his book, Cinema Bhojpuri, Avijit Ghosh lauds Patowary for her "remarkable contribution" to Bhojpuri film music. "Gifted with a rich, powerful and sensuous voice, the singer from Assam is almost considered mandatory for any film's score," he writes.

Early life and background 

Patowary was born in a Yogi-Nath family of Nath samradaya community in Barpeta district in Assam. A graduate in English literature, Patowary is an alumnus of Cotton College of Guwahati. Trained in Kamrupiya and Goalporiya folk music by her folksinger father Sri Bipin Nath Patowary, Kalpana started to publicly perform at the tender age of 4 with her father and is also trained as Sangeet Visharad in Indian classical music from Bhatkhande Music Institute University, Lucknow. She sings many forms of Bhojpuri folk music including Purvi, Pachra, Kajri, Sohar, Vivaah geet, Chaita, and Nautanki.

Patowary has worked little on the works of Bhikhari Thakur and has released an album commemorating his life and work.

Career
Patowary is the first Bhojpuri singer to present an age old tradition of Khadi Birha tradition to international platforms.

In 2013, Patowary made an appearance in a documentary film, Bidesia in Bambai. Released on 8 December 2013, it is a look at Mumbai through the lens of the migrant worker and his music.

She was invited to perform on a 15-day tour in four Latin American countries presented by the Ministry of Cultural Affairs on the occasion of Indian Arrival Day.

Patowary is the first woman to record and sing in the Chhaprahiya Purvi style. Prior to her work, Purvi was a male preserve.

Patowary also made her acting debut in the Bhojpuri movie, Chalat Musafir Moh Liyo Re playing the role of Janki, co-starring opposite Dinesh Lal Yadav.

She also participated in the reality show Junoon - Kuchh Kar Dikhaane Ka (2008) on NDTV Imagine.

Political career
In October 2020 Patowary joined the Asom Gana Parishad at an event held at party's head office in Guwahati.

Discography

Hindi film songs

Tamil film songs

Marathi film songs

Assamese film songs

Bengali film songs

Filmography

References

External links

Living people
People from Barpeta district
Singers from Assam
Bhojpuri-language singers
Bhojpuri playback singers
Bollywood playback singers
Hindi-language singers
Assamese-language singers
Assamese playback singers
Bengali playback singers
Women musicians from Assam
Cotton College, Guwahati alumni
Indian women folk singers
Indian folk singers
Indian women classical singers
Indian women playback singers
Indian film actresses
Actresses in Bhojpuri cinema
Assam politicians
Asom Gana Parishad politicians
Women in Assam politics
20th-century Indian women singers
20th-century Indian singers
21st-century Indian women singers
21st-century Indian singers
Year of birth missing (living people)